Narazaki (written: 楢崎, 楢﨑 or 奈良崎) is a Japanese surname. Notable people with the surname include:

, Japanese footballer
, Japanese judoka
, Japanese footballer

Japanese-language surnames